The Mist is the name of different DC Comics supervillains, archenemies of the original and 1990s Starman.

Kyle Nimbus made his live-action debut on the first season of The Flash, portrayed by Anthony Carrigan.

Publication history
The Kyle Nimbus version of the Mist first appears in Adventure Comics #67 and was created by Gardner Fox.

The Nash Nimbus version of the Mist first appears in Starman (vol. 2) #0 and was created by James Robinson and Tony Harris.

Fictional character biography

Kyle

The first Mist's real name was Kyle. He fought in World War I as a Captain in the Canadian Army, winning the Victoria Cross. He was also a scientist and created a device that turned his body into a gaseous form; he became a supervillain, first fighting the Golden Age Sandman under the name 'Johnathon Smythe', before changing his name to the Mist. In 1941, he undertook a crime wave in Opal City and was stopped by Ted Knight, the Golden Age Starman; he vowed revenge on Starman and became his nemesis.

He was a member of the Ultra-Humanite's incarnation of the Secret Society of Super Villains, and appeared during the late 1980s Starman series (chronicling the adventures of Will Payton), then using the name Nimbus.

The Mist had two children named Nash and Kyle Jr.

In the early 1990s, after Ted Knight had retired (following the events of Zero Hour), the Mist planned his final revenge on Starman and sent his son, Kyle Jr., to kill Knight's son David, as well as nearly killing his second son, Jack, demolishing his home and kidnapping the elder Knight. In exchange for his father, Jack battled Kyle Jr., resulting in Kyle Jr.'s death, which drove the Mist insane. He was like this for some time until making a deal with the demon-lord Neron, restoring his sanity and curing his senility. This allowed him to advise his daughter, Nash, on joining Simon Culp's scheme to destroy Opal City and conversely kill Culp himself when he threatened her, on the grounds he "hated dwarfs". Ultimately, he revealed he was tired and had decided to end his life, planting a nuclear bomb in Opal City set to detonate at the moment of his death and then taking poison. However, he failed to destroy the city, as a terminally ill Ted Knight used an advanced version of his Cosmic Rod to lift the entire building miles into the air; the two enemies made peace with each other just before the Mist's heart stopped, killing them both.

Earth-Two version
What follows is an account of the Mist's history as it existed on the world of Earth-Two, prior to the consolidating of DC Comics' alternate Earths in the Crisis on Infinite Earths miniseries. Much of this can still be considered canon where it does not contradict later established information.

June 1962 saw Earth-Two's public re-emergence of Vandal Savage. He briefly terrorized a handful of important U.S. cities and was able to attack and incapacitate various members of the retired JSA. This brazen attack on major American cities and on the persons of a handful of retired JSAers resulted in the re-emergence and the re-formation of the Justice Society of America. This did not have an immediate effect on the super-scientists and criminals who operated openly in the 1940s and covertly in the 1950s, but over time this curious breed of villain did begin to re-emerge.

September 1965 found the Mist working with a gang of hoodlums along the Atlantic Coast in Park City. With his secret formulas and gadgetry he was controlling Mrs. Dinah Drake Lance, using the Drake Flower Shoppe as the means to gain access to the wealthy citizenry, and using his hypnotic influence to have the rich rob themselves and hand over their wealth to the Mist's henchmen.

Though Park City did have a protector in the guise of the Black Canary, this heroine was only seen infrequently and the Mist seemed not to have been perturbed by this. Though he was using Mrs. Lance, he never discovered her dual identity as the Black Canary.

By September, his crime spree was advancing nicely and was baffling the local police. Finally, a local private investigator – Mr. Larry Lance (husband to Dinah Drake Lance) figured out the connection between those robbed and his wife's flower shop. At about this time, the Lance family was visited by their friend Ted Knight; he accidentally intercepted a hypnotic sound wave sent by the Mist. Together, the three heroes went about hunting down the gang and its leader.

During this crime spree, the Mist discovered how to use his inviso-solution, sound waves and a recording of motor noises from the Park City Observatory to block star-energy from reaching Starman's Cosmic Rod, in effect making it powerless; however, Starman had with him a newer, quasar-powered Rod, which proved impervious to the deactivation. In the end, the Mist and his men were defeated and handed over to the police.

Nash 
Nash was not initially the villain that her father or brother were, but rather a meek, stuttering girl. During her father's campaign of revenge against Ted Knight, she was in a position to kill Jack Knight, but let him go after he reasoned that she personally had no reason to kill him. After Jack killed her brother Kyle, she underwent a major personality shift and became the second Mist, exposing herself to the same process that had given her father his powers. During her first major crime wave, Nash drugged Jack and raped him, becoming pregnant. She later gave birth to a son, Kyle Theo, named after her father and Jack. She passed on a second opportunity to kill Jack, deciding to better herself as a villain while Jack worked to become a better hero. She spent much time in Europe, where she killed the second Amazing Man, the Crimson Fox and Blue Devil.

She was then one of the many villains who took part in the plan to destroy Opal City during the "Grand Guignol" story arc. After this failed, her father made his own attempt to destroy the city. Since his plan would kill Nash and her son, she attempted to stop him. Her father then shot her. In her dying moments, she gave her son over to Jack to raise.

Powers and abilities
Both Mists are able to transform into a living vapor and become tangible and intangible at will.

Other versions
In the pages of Earth 2: Society, Kyle Nimbus is the CEO of Nimbus Solutions who can make himself intangible at will where he has to be tangible to attack. In his plans, he used mind-control chemicals on Hourman's Miraclo in order for him to serve Nimbus. With help from Red Arrow and Ted Grant, Dick Grayson as Batman defeated Kyle Nimbus.

In other media
 The Kyle Nimbus incarnation of the Mist appears on The Flash, portrayed by Anthony Carrigan. Introduced in the episode "Things You Can't Outrun", this version is a mob hitman who was betrayed by and testified against his employers. After being charged, he was put on death row. However, as he was in the midst of being executed via gas chamber, S.T.A.R. Labs' particle accelerator exploded, giving him the ability to transform into the gas that was being used to execute him. With his powers, he attempts to kill all of the people he deemed responsible for imprisoning him before the Flash exploits Nimbus' weakness and keeps him trapped in his gaseous state until he falls unconscious. Nimbus is later locked in a makeshift cell in the converted particle accelerator. After making a minor appearance in the episode "Power Outage", Nimbus returns in the episode "Rogue Air" when the S.T.A.R. Labs team attempts to transfer their metahuman prisoners to a new prison, only for Captain Cold to free them.
 A composite character based on Kyle and Nash, renamed Andrea "Andie" Murphy, appears in Young Justice, voiced by Daniela Bobadilla. This version is a reluctant teenage criminal who leaves her clothes behind when she transforms into her gaseous state. Introduced in the episode "Triptych" as part of a metahuman trafficking operation, she, Livewire, and  Shade battle Nightwing's team. Despite her reluctance, Andie fights Nightwing himself until he uses a freeze grenade to subdue her. Following this, Andie is given residence at the Metahuman Youth Center. As of season four, Andie has joined the Team.

References

External links
 Mist (Kyle Nimbus) at DC Comics Wiki
 Mist (Nash) at DC Comics Wiki

Articles about multiple fictional characters
Characters created by James Robinson
Comics characters introduced in 1941
Comics characters introduced in 1994
DC Comics supervillains
DC Comics male supervillains
DC Comics female supervillains
DC Comics metahumans
Earth-Two
Fictional recipients of the Victoria Cross
Fictional Canadian Army personnel
Fictional World War I veterans
Fictional military captains
Fictional rapists
Fictional serial killers
Characters created by Gardner Fox
DC Comics television characters
Golden Age supervillains
Fictional stutterers
Fictional murdered people
Fictional filicides
DC Comics characters who are shapeshifters
Fictional characters who can turn intangible